Rahbek is a surname. Notable people with the surname include: 

Kamma Rahbek (1775–1829), Danish artist, salonist, and lady of letters
Knud Lyne Rahbek (1760–1830), Danish literary historian, critic, writer, poet, and magazine editor